The highest-selling digital singles in Japan are ranked in the RIAJ Digital Track Chart, published by Recording Industry Association of Japan. The chart week runs from Wednesday to Tuesday. The final December 29 chart week was merged with the following week (12/30-1/5)'s tally, due to New Year's celebrations (in a similar manner to Oricon).

Chart history

See also
List of number one Reco-kyō Chart singles 2006–2009

References

Japan
Digital singles of 2009
Recording Industry Association of Japan
2009 in Japanese music